Theodore William Gamelin is an American mathematician. He is a professor emeritus of mathematics at the University of California, Los Angeles.

Gamelin was born in 1939.
He received his B.S. degree in mathematics from Yale University in 1960,
and completed his Ph.D. at the University of California, Berkeley in 1963. His doctoral advisor was František Wolf. His doctoral dissertation was titled The extension problem for restrictions of functions in a subspace of C(X).
He served as C.L.E. Moore Instructor at the Massachusetts Institute of Technology from 1963 to 1965, before joining the UCLA faculty.

In 2012, he became one of the inaugural Fellows of the American Mathematical Society.

Selected publications 
 Complex Analysis (Undergraduate Texts in Mathematics, Springer, 2001)
 Complex Dynamics (with Lennart Carleson, Universitext, Springer, 1993, 
 Introduction to Topology (with Robert Everist Greene, Saunders College Publishing, 1983, ; 2nd ed., Dover, 1999)
 Uniform Algebras and Jensen Measures (London Mathematical Society Lecture Note Series 32, Cambridge University Press, 1978)
 Uniform Algebras (Prentice-Hall, 1969)

References

External links
 

20th-century American mathematicians
1953 births
Living people
Yale College alumni
University of California, Berkeley alumni
Massachusetts Institute of Technology School of Science faculty
University of California, Los Angeles faculty
Fellows of the American Mathematical Society